Samantha Leriche-Gionet (born March 8, 1985), also known by the pseudonym Boum, is a French Canadian animator, illustrator, and comic strip author, as well as a filmmaker. She has always lived in Montréal-Est, Quebec.

Biography
Samantha Leriche-Gionet was born on March 8, 1985, in Montreal, Quebec.
Leriche-Gionet studied animation, first at the Cégep du Vieux Montréal. In 2010, she graduated from Concordia University's Film Animation program, and in the following year, with David Barlow-Krelina, she competed at the Annecy International Animation Film Festival in the graduation film category. 

From 2011, after participating in Hourly Comic Day, she developed a webcomic called Boumeries, published three times a week. This series presents "short autobiographical anecdotes of four panels". The volumes are self-published from 2011, and, in parallel, the author is a freelancer in animation and illustration. In 2011, the first volume was awarded the Expozine prize for alternative publishing in the "Francophone comic strip" category. The ninth volume was nominated for the 2020 Doug Wright Award.

La Petite Révolution was published by Front Froid in 2012; the story centered on a character named Florence, an orphan, who goes through a revolution on the rhythms of Boris Vian. The book was short-listed for the Ignatz Awards in the Outstanding online comics category in 201610. In 2019, La Pastèque published Nausées matinales et autres petits bonheurs, in which the artist humorously evokes pregnancy. In 2020, Leriche-Gionet was the winner of the Bédélys Independent Francophone prize for volume 10 of Boumeries.

Personal life
Leriche-Gionet is married and has two daughters. Afflicted with eye diseases for over a decade, she lost the use of her right eye since 2021.

Awards and honours
 2011, Expozine prize for alternative publishing in the “Francophone comic strip” category for Boumeries
 2020, Bédélys Independent Francophone prize for volume 10 of Boumeries

Selected works
 Boumeries (2011-)
 Culottes Courtes (2011)
 La petite revolution (2012); A Small Revolution (2017, English)

Filmography
 Fou tu (2005)
 Lucien Superstar (2007)
 Le paquet/The Parcel (2008)
 Le grand saut/The Great Jump (2009)
 Snowflakes & Carrots (2010)

References

Bibliography

External links
 
 Boum at 

1985 births
Living people
Canadian animators
Canadian illustrators
Canadian comic strip cartoonists
Canadian women film producers
Canadian women animators
Canadian women illustrators
Concordia University alumni
Film producers from Quebec
Artists with disabilities
21st-century pseudonymous writers
Pseudonymous artists
Pseudonymous women writers